Michael Horn may refer to:

 Michael Horn (businessman), chief executive officer and president of Volkswagen Group of America
 Michael "J" Horn, American pop singer
 Mike Horn, South African-born Swiss explorer and adventurer

See also
 Michael Killisch-Horn (1940–2019), Austrian politician
 Michiel Horn, Canadian historian